Veerapan Komolsen (born 16 March 1946) is a Thai boxer. He competed in the men's flyweight event at the 1964 Summer Olympics. At the 1964 Summer Olympics, he lost to John McCluskey of Great Britain.

References

1946 births
Living people
Veerapan Komolsen
Veerapan Komolsen
Boxers at the 1964 Summer Olympics
Place of birth missing (living people)
Flyweight boxers